Pobres millonarios ("Poor Millionaires") is a 1957 Mexican film. It stars Sara García.

Cast
 Antonio Espino - (as Antonio Espino Clavillazo)
 Ana Luisa Peluffo		
 Irma Dorantes		
 Sara García - Doña Margarita del Valle
 Alejandro Ciangherotti - (as Alejandro Changuerotti)
 Emma Roldán		
 Fidel Ángel Espino		
 Malena Doria		
 Víctor Manuel Castro - (as Manuel Castro)
 Lina Madrigal		
 Julián García		
 Francisco Reiguera - (as Paco Reiguera)
 Eduardo Charpenel		
 José Luis Moreno - (as Jose Luis Moreno 'Pistache')
 José Wilhelmy - (as Jose A. Wilelmi)

External links
 

1957 films
Mexican comedy films
1950s Spanish-language films
1950s Mexican films